Linguistic imperialism or language imperialism is occasionally defined as "the transfer of a dominant language to other people". This language "transfer" (or rather unilateral imposition) comes about because of imperialism. The transfer is considered to be a sign of power; traditionally military power but also, in the modern world, economic power. Aspects of the dominant culture are usually transferred along with the language. In spatial terms, indigenous languages are employed in the function of official (state) languages in Eurasia, while only non-indigenous imperial (European) languages in the "Rest of the World". In the modern world, linguistic imperialism may also be considered in the context of international development, affecting the standard by which organizations like the International Monetary Fund and the World Bank evaluate the trustworthiness and value of structural adjustment loans.

Since the early 1990s, linguistic imperialism has attracted attention among scholars of applied linguistics. In particular, Robert Phillipson's 1992 book, Linguistic Imperialism, has led to considerable debate about its merits and shortcomings. Phillipson found denunciations of linguistic imperialism that dated back to Nazi critiques of the British Council (European aristocracy was, at the time, agreeing on the use of English), and to Soviet analyses of English as the language of world capitalism and world domination. In this vein, criticism of English as a world language is often rooted in anti-globalism.

Definition 
Linguistic imperialism is a form of linguicism which benefits and grants power to the dominating/oppressing language and its speakers. As summarized by linguists Heath Rose and John Conama, Dr. Phillipson argues that the defining characteristics of linguistic imperialism are:
 As a form of linguicism, which manifests in favoring the dominant language over another along similar lines as racism and sexism.
 As a structurally manifested idea, where more resources and infrastructure are given to the dominant language
 As being ideological, in that it encourages beliefs that the dominant language form is more prestigious than others. These ideas are hegemonic and internalized and naturalized as being "normal".
 As intertwined with the same structure as imperialism in culture, education, media, and politics.
 As having an exploitative essence, which causes injustice and inequality between those who use the dominant language and those who do not.
 As having a subtractive influence on other languages, in that learning the dominant language is at the expense of others.
 As being contested and resisted, because of these factors.

Although it is not easy to determine the intentions of specific policies which have led to linguicism, some scholars believe that intent can be proven by observing whether imperialist practices are continued once their sociolinguistic, sociological, psychological, political, and educational harm of other languages are made aware.

History 

The impacts of colonization on linguistic traditions vary based on the form of colonization experienced: trader, settler or exploitation. Congolese-American linguist Salikoko Mufwene describes trader colonization as one of the earliest forms of European colonization. In regions such as the western coast of Africa as well as the Americas, trade relations between European colonizers and indigenous peoples led to the development of pidgin languages. Some of these languages, such as Delaware Pidgin and Mobilian Jargon, were based on Native American languages, while others, such as Nigerian Pidgin and Cameroonian Pidgin, were based on European ones. As trader colonization proceeded mainly via these hybrid languages, rather than the languages of the colonizers, scholars like Mufwene contend that it posed little threat to indigenous languages.

Trader colonization was often followed by settler colonization, where European colonizers settled in these colonies to build new homes. Hamel, a Mexican linguist, argues that "segregation" and "integration" were two primary ways through which settler colonists engaged with aboriginal cultures. In countries such as Uruguay, Brazil, Argentina, and those in the Caribbean, segregation and genocide decimated indigenous societies. Widespread death due to war and illness caused many indigenous populations to lose their indigenous languages. In contrast, in countries that pursued policies of "integration", such as Mexico, Guatemala and the Andean states, indigenous cultures were lost as aboriginal tribes mixed with colonists. In these countries, the establishment of new European orders led to the adoption of colonial languages in governance and industry. In addition, European colonists also viewed the dissolution of indigenous societies and traditions as necessary for the development of a unified nation state. This led to efforts to destroy tribal languages and cultures: in Canada and the United States, for example, Native children were sent to boarding schools such as Col. Richard Pratt's Carlisle Indian Industrial School. Today, in countries such as the United States, Canada and Australia, which were once settler colonies, indigenous languages are spoken by only a small minority of the populace.

Mufwene also draws a distinction between settler colonies and exploitation colonies. In the latter, the process of colonization was focused on the extraction of raw materials needed in Europe. As a result, Europeans were less invested in their exploitation colonies, and few colonists planned to build homes in these colonies. As a result, indigenous languages were able to survive to a greater extent in these colonies compared to settler colonies. In exploitation colonies, colonial languages were often only taught to a small local elite. During the period of British rule in India, for example, Lord Macaulay highlighted the need for "...a class who may be interpreters between us and the millions who govern... a class of persons, Indian in blood and color, but English in taste, in my opinion, in morals and in intellect" in his now-famous "Macaulay minutes", which were written in support of the English Education Act of 1835. The linguistic differences between the local elite and other locals exacerbated class stratification, and also increased inequality in access to education, industry and civic society in postcolonial states.

English 

In Linguistic Imperialism, Robert Henry Phillipson defines English linguistic imperialism as "the dominance of English... asserted and maintained by the establishment and continuous reconstitution of structural and cultural inequalities  between English and other languages." English is often called a worldwide "lingua franca", but Phillipson argues that when its dominance leads to a linguicide, it can be more aptly titled a "lingua frankensteinia" by his view.

Phillipson's theory supports the historic spread of English as an international language and that language's continued dominance, particularly in postcolonial settings such as Wales, Scotland, Ireland, India, Pakistan, Uganda, Zimbabwe, etc., but also increasingly in "neo-colonial" settings such as continental Europe. His theory draws mainly on Johan Galtung's imperialism theory, Antonio Gramsci's theory, and in particular on his notion of cultural hegemony.

A central theme of Phillipson's theory is the complex hegemonic processes which, he asserts, continue to sustain the pre-eminence of English in the world today. His book analyzes the British Council's use of rhetoric to promote English, and discusses key tenets of English applied linguistics and English-language-teaching methodology. These tenets hold that:
 English is best taught monolingually ("the monolingual fallacy");
 the ideal teacher is a native speaker ("the native-speaker fallacy");
 the earlier English is taught, the better the results ("the early-start fallacy");
 the more English is taught, the better the results ("the maximum-exposure fallacy");
 if other languages are used much, standards of English will drop ("the subtractive fallacy").

According to Phillipson, those who promote English—organizations such as the British Council, the IMF and the World Bank, and individuals such as operators of English-language schools—use three types of argument:
 Intrinsic arguments describe the English language as "providential", "rich", "noble" and "interesting". Such arguments tend to assert what English is and what other languages are not.
 Extrinsic arguments point out that English is well-established: that it has many speakers, and that there are trained teachers and a wealth of teaching material.
 Functional arguments emphasize the usefulness of English as a gateway to the world.

Other arguments for English are:
 its economic utility: it enables people to get access to some technologies
 its ideological function: it is said as standing for modernity;
 its status might be seen as symbol for material advance and efficiency.

Another theme in Phillipson's work is "linguicism"—the kind of prejudice which can lead to endangered languages becoming extinct or losing their local eminence due to the rise and competing prominence of English.

Other languages 
At various times, especially in colonial settings or where a dominant culture has sought to unify a region under its control, a similar phenomenon has arisen. In the Roman Empire, Latin—originally the language of a limited region in central Italy—was imposed first on the rest of Italy and later on parts of Europe, largely displacing local languages, while in Roman Africa Latin was dominant only until it and the native languages were displaced by Arabization.

Anatolia had similar linguistic diversity when it was ruled by small native states.  Under the Persian and Hellenistic empires, the tongue of the conqueror served as the lingua franca. The indigenous Anatolian languages disappeared.

In the Far East, Africa and the Americas, regional languages have been or are being coercively replaced or slighted—Tibetan and regional Chinese varieties by Mandarin Chinese, Ainu and Ryukyuan by Japanese, Quechua and Mesoamerican languages by Spanish, Malayo-Polynesian languages by Malay (incl. Indonesian), Philippine languages by Filipino and so on. Arabization has eliminated many indigenous Berber languages in North Africa and restricted Coptic to sacred use by Coptic Christian Orthodox Church.

The English language during the Middle Ages was an object of linguistic imperialism by the French language, particularly following the Norman conquest. For hundreds of years, French or Anglo-Norman was the language of administration (See Law French) and therefore a language of higher status in England. Latin remained the tongue of church and learning. Although many words introduced by the Normans are today indistinguishable by most English-speakers from native Germanic words, later-learned loanwords, copied from Latin or French may "sound more cultured" to a native English-speaker.

Following the establishment of the Holy Roman Empire over much of present-day Germany and Central Europe, the German language and its dialects became the preferred language of many Central-European nobility. With varying success, German spread across much of Central and Eastern Europe as a language of trade and status. This ended with World War II (See also Germanization.).

French has also expanded. Languages such as Occitan, Breton, Basque, Catalan and Corsican have been slighted in France. This process, known as Francization, often causes resistance amongst the subject peoples, leading to demands for independence. Examples of this can still be found in Breton nationalism and in the Flanders' Flemish Movement in Belgium).

In Italy there is a situation similar to the French one, with Italian that has expanded at the expense of languages such as Sardinian, Sicilian, Ladin, Venetian and Friulan, while languages such as German (in South Tyrol) or French (in Aosta Valley), historically persecuted, are now co-official in those regions (See also Italianization).
 
Portuguese and Spanish colonization made these languages prevalent in South America and in parts of Africa and Asia (the Philippines, Macau, and for a short time Formosa).  In Spain, Spanish spread and was imposed over other languages, becoming the only official language of the state from the 18th to the 20th century. It was labelled "the companion of the Empire" by Antonio de Nebrija (1492) in the introduction to his Gramática de la lengua castellana.

Russian linguistic imperialism can be seen in Belarus both in the former dispute over the name of the country (Belarus vs Belorussia) and in the common spelling of the name of their president. The English transcription of his name is the Russian form, Alexander Lukashenko, instead of the Belarusian form, Alyaksandr Lukashenka.

In post-independence India, there were attempts to make Hindi as the sole official language which was vehemently opposed by various provinces, particularly by the state of Tamil Nadu. In Karnataka, linguistic imperialism manifests as pushes to impose Kannada almost everywhere.

Criticism 
Many scholars have participated in lively discussions of Phillipson's claims. Alan Davies, for instance, envisions the ghost of Phillipson haunting the Department of Applied Linguistics in Edinburgh:

For Davies, two cultures inhabit linguistic imperialism: one, a culture of guilt ("colonies should never have happened"); the other, that of romantic despair ("we shouldn't be doing what we are doing"). Rajagopalan goes a step farther and maintains that Phillipson's book has led to a guilt complex among English language learning and teaching (ELT) professionals.

Davies also argues that Phillipson's claims are not falsifiable: what "if the dominated... wanted to adopt English and continue to want to keep it? Phillipson's unfalsifiable answer must be that they don't, they can't, they've been persuaded against their better interests." It has thus been argued that Phillipson's theory is patronizing in its implication that developing countries lack independent decision-making capacity (to adopt or not to adopt ELT). In the context of Nigeria, Bisong holds that people in the "periphery" use English pragmatically—they send their children to English-language schools precisely because they want them to grow up multilingual. Regarding Phillipson, Bisong maintains that "to interpret such actions as emanating from people who are victims of Centre linguistic imperialism is to bend sociolinguistic evidence to suit a preconceived thesis". If English should be abolished because it is foreign, Bisong argues, then Nigeria itself would also have to be dissolved, because it was conceived as a colonial structure.

Furthermore, the assumption that the English language itself is imperialistic has come under attack. Henry Widdowson has argued that "there is a fundamental contradiction in the idea that the language of itself exerts hegemonic control: namely that if this were the case, you would never be able to challenge such control". Additionally, the idea that the promotion of English necessarily implies a demotion of local languages has been challenged. Holborrow points out that "not all Englishes in the centre dominate, nor are all speakers in the periphery equally discriminated against". Hiberno-English or New Zealand English or even England's regional dialects such as Cornish English, for instance, could be regarded as a non-dominant centre variety of English.

Some scholars believe that English's dominance is not due to specific language policies, but rather as a side-effect of the spread of English-speaking colonists through colonization and globalization.

Thus it could be argued that, while those who follow Phillipson see choices about language as externally imposed, the other camp sees them as personal choices.

Response 
Those who support the arguments favoring the existence of linguistic imperialism claim that arguments against it are often advanced by monolingual native-speakers of English who may see the current status of English as a fact worthy of celebration.

Those who see the increasing spread of English in the world as a worrying development (which lowers the status of local and regional languages as well as potentially undermining or eroding cultural values) are likely to be more receptive to Phillipson's views. Alastair Pennycook, Suresh Canagarajah, Adrian Holliday and Julian Edge fall into this group and are described as critical applied linguists.

However, Henry Widdowson’s remarks on critical discourse analysis may also be applied to the critical applied linguists:

In Ireland, the issue of de-anglicising the influence of English has been a topic of debate in the country even before independence. An argument for de-anglicisation was delivered before the Irish National Literary Society in Dublin, 25 November 1892; "When we speak of 'The Necessity for De-Anglicising the Irish Nation', we mean it, not as a protest against imitating what is best in the English people, for that would be absurd, but rather to show the folly of neglecting what is Irish, and hastening to adopt, pell-mell, and indiscriminately, everything that is English, simply because it is English."

According to Ghil'ad Zuckermann, "Native tongue title and language rights should be promoted. The government ought to define Aboriginal and Torres Strait Islander vernaculars as official languages of Australia. We must change the linguistic landscape of Whyalla and elsewhere. Signs should be in both English and the local indigenous language. We ought to acknowledge intellectual property of indigenous knowledge including language, music and dance."

Appropriation 
Some who reject the idea of linguistic imperialism argue that the global spread of English is better understood in the framework of appropriation—that English is used around the world for local purposes.  In addition to the example of Nigeria, other examples have been given:
 Demonstrators in non-English-speaking countries often use signs in English to convey their demands to TV audiences around the world. In some cases, demonstrators may not understand what their signs say.
 Bobda shows how Cameroon has moved away from a mono-cultural, Anglo-centered way of teaching English and has gradually accommodated teaching materials to a Cameroonian context. Non-Western topics are treated, such as rule by emirs, traditional medicine, and polygamy. Bobda argues for bi-cultural, Cameroonian and Anglo-American education.
 Kramsch and Sullivan describe how Western methodology and textbooks have been appropriated to suit local Vietnamese culture.
 The Pakistani textbook Primary Stage English includes lessons such as "Pakistan, My Country", "Our Flag," and "Our Great Leader", which might sound jingoistic to western ears. Within the native culture, however, establishing a connection between ELT, patriotism and the Muslim faith is seen as an aim of ELT, as the chairman of the Punjab Textbook Board openly states: "The board... takes care, through these books to inoculate in the students a love of the Islamic values and awareness to guard the ideological frontiers of your [the student's] home lands."

Such an "internationalization" of English may also offer new possibilities to English native-speakers. McCabe elaborates:

See also 

 Anglicisation
 Critical applied linguistics
 Cultural hegemony
 English as a second or foreign language
 Esperanto
 International auxiliary language
 International English
 Language immersion
 Language policy
 Language planning
 Language revitalization
 Language death
 Linguistic purism
 Language secessionism
 Monolingualism
 Bilingualism
 Multilingualism
 Code-switching
 Translanguaging
 Official language
 Untranslatability
 World language
 Father Tongue hypothesis
 Latinx

Notes

References 

 Acar, A. (2006). "Models, Norms and Goals for English as an International Language Pedagogy and Task Based Language Teaching and Learning." The Asian EFL Journal Vol. 8 2006
 Bisong, Joseph (1995 [1994]) Language Choice and cultural Imperialism: a Nigerian Perspective. ELT Journal 49/2 122–132.
 Bobda, Augustin Simo (1997) Sociocultural Constraints in EFL Teaching in Cameroon. In: Pütz, Martin (ed.) The cultural Context in Foreign Language Teaching. Frankfurt a.M.: Lang. 221–240.
 Brutt-Griffler, Janina (2002) World English. Multilingual Matters. 
 Canagarajah, A. Suresh (1999), Resisting Linguistic Imperialism in English Teaching, Oxford University Press. 
 Canagarajah, A. Suresh, Thomas Ricento & Terrence G. Wiley [eds.] (2002) Journal of Language, Identity, and Education. Special issue. Lawrence Erlbaum Associates. 
 Canagarajah, A. Suresh [ed.] (2004) Reclaiming the Local in Language Policy and Practice. Lawrence Erlbaum Associates. 
 Crystal, David (2003), English as a Global Language, 2nd ed., Cambridge University Press. 
 Davies, Alan (1996) Review Article: ironising the Myth of Linguicism. Journal of Multilingual and Multicultural Development. 17/6: 485–596.
 Davies, Alan (1997) Response to a Reply. Journal of Multilingual and Multicultural Development 18/3 248.
 Edge, Julian [ed.] (2006) (Re-)Locating TESOL in an Age of Empire. Palgrave Macmillan. 
 Holborow, Marnie (1999) Politics of English. Sage Publications. 
 Holborrow, Marnie (1993) Review Article: linguistic Imperialism. ELT Journal 47/4 358–360.
 Holliday, Adrian (2005),  Struggle to Teach English as an International Language , Oxford University Press. 
 Kontra, Miklos, Robert Phillipson, Tove Skutnabb-Kangas & Tibor Varady [eds.] (1999), Language: A Right and a Resource, Central European University Press. 
 Kramsch, Klaire and Patricia Sullivan (1996) Appropriate Pedagogy. ELT Journal 50/3 199–212.
 Malik, S.A. Primary Stage English (1993). Lahore: Tario Brothers.
 Master, Peter (1998) Positive and Negative Aspects of the Dominance of English. TESOL Quarterly, 32/4. 716–727. 
 Pennycook, Alastair (1995), The Cultural Politics of English as an International Language, Longman. 
 Pennycook, Alastair (1998), English and the Discourses of Colonialism, Routledge. 
 Pennycook, Alastair (2001), Critical Applied Linguistics, Lawrence Erlbaum Associates. 
 Pennycook, Alastair (2006) Global Englishes and Transcultural Flows. Routledge. 
 Phillipson, Robert (1992), Linguistic Imperialism, Oxford University Press. 
 Phillipson, Robert [ed.] (2000), Rights to Language, Lawrence Erlbaum Associates. 
 Phillipson, Robert (2003) English-Only Europe? Routledge. 
 Punjab Text Book Board (1997) My English Book Step IV. Lahore: Metro Printers.
 Rajagopalan, Kanavilli (1999) Of EFL Teachers, Conscience and Cowardice. ELT Journal 53/3 200–206.
 Ramanathan, Vaidehi (2005) The English-Vernacular Divide. Multilingual Matters. 
 Rahman, Tariq (1996) Language and Politics in Pakistan Karachi: Oxford University Press
 Ricento, Thomas [ed.] (2000) Ideology, Politics, and Language Policies. John Benjamins. 
 Skutnabb-Kangas, Tove & Robert Phillipson [eds.]; Mart Rannut (1995), Linguistic Human Rights, Mouton De Gruyter. 
 Silva, Diego B. (2019). Language policy in Oceania. Alfa, Rev. Linguíst. 63 (2).
 Sonntag, Selma K. (2003) The Local Politics of Global English. Lexington Books. 
 Spichtinger, Daniel (2000) The Spread of English and its Appropriation. University of Vienna, Vienna.
 Tsui, Amy B.M. & James W. Tollefson (in press) Language Policy, Culture, and Identity in Asian Contexts. Lawrence Erlbaum Associates. 
 Widdowson, H.G. (1998a) EIL: squaring the Circles. A Reply. World Englishes 17/3 397–401.
 Widdowson, H.G. (1998b) The Theory and Practice of Critical Discourse Analysis. Applied Linguistics 19/1 136–151.

Linguistic rights
Language contact
Linguistic discrimination
Imperialism
Cultural assimilation
English as a global language
Sociolinguistics